Alberto Aguilar Leiva (born 12 July 1984), known simply as Alberto, is a Spanish professional footballer who plays for Antequera CF as a defensive midfielder or central defender.

He totalled 278 games and 18 goals in Segunda División, with Málaga B, Granada 74, Albacete, Córdoba and Ponferradina. In La Liga he represented Málaga (one appearance) and Getafe (32), and also played professionally in Australia and Cyprus.

Club career
Alberto was born in Benamejí, Córdoba. A product of Málaga CF's youth system, he made his professional debuts for the first team in the last match of the 2002–03 season, a 0–1 La Liga away loss against RCD Mallorca, while also helping the reserves achieve a 2003 promotion to Segunda División.

For the 2005–06 campaign, Alberto signed with Madrid's Getafe CF, totalling 30 top-flight appearances in his first two years and also playing an important part in the team's runner-up run in the Copa del Rey. However, the arrival of coach Michael Laudrup deemed him surplus to requirements in his third, which prompted a release in January 2008 with a move to second level club Granada 74 CF.

Alberto stayed in that tier ahead of the following season, joining Albacete Balompié. In August 2010, as a free agent, he returned to his native Andalusia after agreeing to a deal at Córdoba CF.

From 2013 to 2015, Alberto continued competing in division two, with SD Ponferradina. On 9 August 2015, aged 31, he moved abroad for the first time, signing for Western Sydney Wanderers.

On 5 May 2016, after having helped his team reach the Grand Final, Alberto was released. In June, he joined Cypriot club Anorthosis Famagusta FC on a one-year deal.

Honours
Getafe
Copa del Rey runner-up: 2006–07

References

External links

1984 births
Living people
Sportspeople from the Province of Córdoba (Spain)
Spanish footballers
Footballers from Andalusia
Association football defenders
Association football midfielders
Association football utility players
La Liga players
Segunda División players
Segunda División B players
Tercera División players
Atlético Malagueño players
Málaga CF players
Getafe CF footballers
Granada 74 CF footballers
Albacete Balompié players
Córdoba CF players
SD Ponferradina players
FC Cartagena footballers
Antequera CF footballers
A-League Men players
Western Sydney Wanderers FC players
Cypriot First Division players
Anorthosis Famagusta F.C. players
Spanish expatriate footballers
Expatriate soccer players in Australia
Expatriate footballers in Cyprus
Spanish expatriate sportspeople in Australia
Spanish expatriate sportspeople in Cyprus